George Gordon, Lord Haddo (28 January 1764 – 2 October 1791) was a Scottish Freemason and the eldest son of George Gordon, 3rd Earl of Aberdeen.

On 18 June 1782, Haddo married Charlotte Baird (d. 8 October 1795) a sister of Sir David Baird, Bt. and they had seven children:
Hon. George Hamilton-Gordon (1784–1869), later 4th Earl of Aberdeen and Prime Minister of the United Kingdom (1852–1855)
Hon. William Gordon (1784–1858), politician and vice-admiral
The Hon. Sir Alexander Gordon (1786–1815), lieutenant-colonel, killed at Waterloo
Lady Alice Gordon (1787–1847), granted the rank of an earl's daughter in 1813, Lady-in-Waiting to Princess Sophia of Gloucester, died unmarried.
Hon. Charles Gordon (1790–1835), soldier
Hon. Sir Robert Gordon (1791–1847), diplomat
Hon. Sir John Gordon (1792–1869), naval officer

Haddo was Grand Master of the Grand Lodge of Scotland from 1784 to 1786. In this capacity he laid the foundation stone of South Bridge, Edinburgh on 1 August 1785. 

He predeceased his father in 1791 and on the latter's death in 1801, the earldom passed to Haddo's eldest son, George.

Legacy

Haddo Peak in the Canadian Rocky Mountains was named in his honour.

Notes

References
 This source cites:

1764 births
1791 deaths
British courtesy barons and lords of Parliament
Heirs apparent who never acceded
Freemasonry in Scotland
18th-century Scottish people
Parents of prime ministers of the United Kingdom
George